The Simferopol Constituency (No. 19) is a Russian legislative constituency in the Republic of Crimea. The constituency covers south-central Crimea, including the entirety of Southern Coast of Crimea.

Members elected

Election results

2016

|-
! colspan=2 style="background-color:#E9E9E9;text-align:left;vertical-align:top;" |Candidate
! style="background-color:#E9E9E9;text-align:left;vertical-align:top;" |Party
! style="background-color:#E9E9E9;text-align:right;" |Votes
! style="background-color:#E9E9E9;text-align:right;" |%
|-
|style="background-color:"|
|align=left|Andrey Kozenko
|align=left|United Russia
|137,938
|63.23%
|-
|style="background-color:"|
|align=left|Oleg Klimchuk
|align=left|Liberal Democratic Party
|24,666
|11.31%
|-
|style="background-color:"|
|align=left|Yelena Gritsak
|align=left|A Just Russia
|15,457
|7.08%
|-
|style="background-color:"|
|align=left|Aleksandr Chernyshev
|align=left|Communist Party
|13,865
|6.36%
|-
|style="background:;"| 
|align=left|Tair Abduvaliyev
|align=left|Communists of Russia
|7,770
|3.56%
|-
|style="background-color:"|
|align=left|Nikolay Khanin
|align=left|Rodina
|3,070
|1.41%
|-
|style="background:"| 
|align=left|Rezeda Salikhova
|align=left|The Greens
|2,667
|1.22%
|-
|style="background:;"| 
|align=left|Aleksandr Talipov
|align=left|Party of Growth
|2,599
|1.19%
|-
|style="background:"| 
|align=left|Anatoly Azardovich
|align=left|Patriots of Russia
|2,572
|1.18%
|-
| colspan="5" style="background-color:#E9E9E9;"|
|- style="font-weight:bold"
| colspan="3" style="text-align:left;" | Total
| 218,170
| 100%
|-
| colspan="5" style="background-color:#E9E9E9;"|
|- style="font-weight:bold"
| colspan="4" |Source:
|
|}

2021

|-
! colspan=2 style="background-color:#E9E9E9;text-align:left;vertical-align:top;" |Candidate
! style="background-color:#E9E9E9;text-align:left;vertical-align:top;" |Party
! style="background-color:#E9E9E9;text-align:right;" |Votes
! style="background-color:#E9E9E9;text-align:right;" |%
|-
|style="background-color:"|
|align=left|Aleksey Chernyak
|align=left|United Russia
|112,204
|49.37%
|-
|style="background-color:"|
|align=left|Oksana Loboda
|align=left|New People
|18,396
|8.09%
|-
|style="background-color:"|
|align=left|Dmitry Nekhaychuk
|align=left|A Just Russia — For Truth
|16,064
|7.07%
|-
|style="background-color:"|
|align=left|Andrey Kocheikhin
|align=left|Communist Party
|16,021
|7.05%
|-
|style="background-color:"|
|align=left|Oleg Pikhterev
|align=left|Liberal Democratic Party
|15,048
|6.62%
|-
|style="background-color:"|
|align=left|Emil Artpatly
|align=left|Rodina
|11,119
|4.89%
|-
|style="background-color:"|
|align=left|Sergey Shevtsov
|align=left|Party of Pensioners
|11,069
|4.87%
|-
|style="background:;"| 
|align=left|Andrey Protsenko
|align=left|Communists of Russia
|8,820
|3.88%
|-
|style="background:"| 
|align=left|Vladimir Sorokin
|align=left|The Greens
|7,000
|3.08%
|-
| colspan="5" style="background-color:#E9E9E9;"|
|- style="font-weight:bold"
| colspan="3" style="text-align:left;" | Total
| 227,264
| 100%
|-
| colspan="5" style="background-color:#E9E9E9;"|
|- style="font-weight:bold"
| colspan="4" |Source:
|
|}

Notes

References

Russian legislative constituencies
Politics of Crimea